The dimorphic egret (Egretta dimorpha) is a species of heron in the family Ardeidae. It is found in Comoros, Kenya, Madagascar, Mayotte, Seychelles, and Tanzania.

The dimorphic egret is sometimes considered as a subspecies of the western reef egret (Egretta gularis) or as a subspecies of the little egret (Egretta garzetta).

The dimorphic egret can sometimes be found on rooftops, finding insects in the gutters of houses.

References

Further reading

Egretta
Taxobox binomials not recognized by IUCN
Birds of East Africa
Birds of Madagascar
Birds of Seychelles
Taxa named by Ernst Hartert
Birds described in 1914
Taxonomy articles created by Polbot